The Winnemucca Grammar School, located at 522 Lay St. in Winnemucca, Nevada, is a historic school that was designed by architect Richard Watkins in Prairie School style.  It was built during 1927–28.  It was listed on the National Register of Historic Places in 1991.

It was deemed significant as representing the period of rapid growth of Winnemucca from 1915 through the 1920s, and as a "good example" of Prairie Style school architecture.  At the time of NRHP listing, the building remained a school, was in "excellent condition", and had been preserved with integrity.

References 

Buildings and structures in Humboldt County, Nevada
Winnemucca, Nevada
Education in Humboldt County, Nevada
School buildings completed in 1927
School buildings on the National Register of Historic Places in Nevada
National Register of Historic Places in Humboldt County, Nevada
1927 establishments in Nevada
Prairie School architecture in Nevada